Hannelore Janele (born 17 April 1943) is an Austrian former swimmer. She competed in the women's 100 metre butterfly at the 1960 Summer Olympics.

References

External links
 

1943 births
Living people
Austrian female butterfly swimmers
Olympic swimmers of Austria
Swimmers at the 1960 Summer Olympics
Swimmers from Vienna